Adi Shankar's Bootleg Universe is a media company founded in 2012 by Indian-American producer Adi Shankar. It began as a YouTube series of unauthorized fan films before evolving into a full-fledged entertainment brand.

Subsidiaries

 The Angry Metal Company
 Shankar Animation

List of works

Bootleg Universe Unauthorized One-Shot Short Films 
A series of unauthorized popular culture satires produced by Shankar.

 The Punisher: Dirty Laundry (July 15, 2012)
 Live-action short film
 Directed by Phil Joanou
 Written by Chad St. John
 Based on the character Punisher by Marvel Comics
 Thomas Jane reprises his role as Marvel's anti-hero Frank Castle / Punisher from the 2004 film The Punisher.
 Venom: Truth In Journalism (July 20, 2013)
 Live-action short film
 Directed and written by Joe Lynch
 Based on the character Venom by Marvel Comics
 In a black and white homage to cult Belgian black comedy Man Bites Dog and set in the late 1980s, Ryan Kwanten stars as Spider-Man's nemesis Eddie Brock.
 Judge Dredd: Superfiend (October 27, 2014) 
 Animated web series
 Directed and written by Enol and Luis Junquera
 Based on the character Judge Dredd by Rebellion Developments
 Loosely adapted from various Judge Dredd storylines such as The Return of Rico and Boyhood of a Superfiend. Originally as a 6-episode web series published on October 27, 2014, it was later published as a "Director's Cut" short film on January 4, 2016.
 Power/Rangers (February 23, 2015) 
 Live-action short film
 Directed by Joseph Kahn
 Written by Joseph Kahn, Dutch Southern and James Van Der Beek
 Based on Power Rangers by Hasbro, Saban Capital Group and Toei Company
 A dark reimagining of Mighty Morphin Power Rangers that explores a timeline where the Rangers lost. Starring James Van Der Beek and Katee Sackhoff.
 James Bond: In Service of Nothing (March 2, 2015) 
 Animated short film
 Directed and written by Tyler Gibb
 Based on James Bond by Ian Fleming Publications
 An animated short film in the style of a film animatic, where after 30 years in the agency, James Bond is no longer required for his services leading to his retirement as he tries to adjust himself to a new life in the present.
 Mr. Rogers: A War Hero (March 20, 2018) 
 Live-action short film
 Directed and written by Kenlon Clark
 Based on Mister Rogers' Neighborhood by WQED Studios and The Fred Rogers Company
 A "What if?" scenario based on the longstanding rumor where Fred Rogers served in the Vietnam War and based several characters on Mister Rogers' Neighborhood from his wartime comrades.
 The End of Pokémon (April 19, 2019) 
 Animated short film
 Directed and written by Enol and Luis Junquera
 Based on Pokémon by Nintendo and The Pokémon Company
 An animated fake trailer for a dark afterward to the Pokémon series in which Ash Ketchum tries to end Pokémon battles after the apparent death of his Pikachu.

Television series

Bootleg Multiverse 

 Castlevania (2017–2021)
 When his wife is burned at the stake after being falsely accused of witchcraft, the vampire Count Dracula declares all the people of Wallachia will pay with their lives. He summons an army of demons which overruns the country, causing the people to live lives of fear and distrust. To combat this, the outcast monster hunter Trevor Belmont takes up arms against Dracula's forces, aided by the magician Sypha Belnades and Dracula's dhampir son Alucard.
 The series is based on the video game series by Konami, and is written by Warren Ellis and produced by Frederator Studios, Powerhouse Animation Studios, Shankar Animation, Project 51 Productions and Mua Film. The first season of four 30-minute episodes was released on July 7, 2017. The second season is eight episodes long and was released on October 26, 2018. The ten-episode third season was released on March 5, 2020. The series ended with the release of its fourth season on May 13, 2021.
 Castlevania: Nocturne (TBA)
 On May 11, 2021, Netflix stated that a new series with a new cast of characters, set in the Castlevania universe, is being planned and that it won't be a spin-off. The series will be focused on Richter Belmont, a descendant of Trevor and Sypha, alongside Maria Renard during the French Revolution.
 Devil May Cry (TBA)
 A series based on Devil May Cry by Capcom is in development, making it the second adaptation of the game after Devil May Cry: The Animated Series. The first season will have eight episodes.
 Untitled Assassin's Creed series
 A series based on Assassin's Creed by Ubisoft is in development.
 Untitled Hyper Light Drifter series
 A series based on Hyper Light Drifter by Playism and Heart Machine is in development.
 Untitled PlayerUnknown's Battlegrounds series
 A series based on PlayerUnknown's Battlegrounds by Brendan Greene and Krafton is in development.

Originals 

 The Guardians of Justice
 A seven episode live-action/animated superhero television series that satirizes DC Comics and the Justice League. The series was released on Netflix on March 1, 2022.
 Captain Laserhawk: A Blood Dragon Remix (TBA)
 The series was announced in June 2021. It will feature Shankar remixed versions of several prominent Ubisoft properties.

Other projects 

 Bootleg Universe Podcast

References

External links
 Adi Shankar's Bootleg Universe on YouTube

Short film series
Fan films
American comedy web series
2012 web series debuts